Eduard Wilhelm Sievers (born 19 March 1820 in Hamburg; died 9 December 1894 in Gotha) was a German Shakespeare scholar and professor in Gotha.

Sievers descended from a hanseatic merchant family. He was cousin of the historian Gottlob Reinhold Sievers and uncle of the geographer Wilhelm Sievers. He studied in Gotha, Berlin and Bonn before earning his Ph.D. in 1842 in Erlangen with De Odrysarum imperio commentatio. After some time teaching at the Johanneum in Hamburg he started in 1845 at the Ernestinum in Gotha.

Sievers published German translations of William Shakespeare's plays and poems along with books about Shakespeare's works.

In 1882, he became Rector of the Ernestine Gymnasium, Gotha, succeeding Joachim Marquardt.

Selected works 
 De Odrysarum imperio commentatio. P. Neusser, Bonn 1842 
 Über die Tragödie überhaupt und Iphigenie in Aulis insbesondere. Als Manuscript gedruckt. Hamburg and Gotha, 1847
 Über die Grundidee des Shakespeareschen Dramas Othello. Gotha, 1851
 Shakespeare's Dramen für weitere Kreise bearbeitet. No. 1-5. Leipzig, 1851–53
 Othello ... Erklärt von Dr. E. W. Sievers. Herrig (L.) Sammlung englischer Schriftsteller. Vol. 4, 1853
 Julius Caesar ... Erklärt von Dr. E. W. Sievers. Herrig (L.) Sammlung englischer Schriftsteller. Vol. 8, 1853
 William Shakespeare. Sein Leben und Dichten. Rud. Besser, Gotha 1866
 Shakespeare's zweiter mittelalterlicher Dramen-Cyclus. Mit einer Einleitung von W. Wetz.  Reuther & Reichard, Berlin 1896

Biography 
Shakespeare Jahrbuch, 31 (1895), S. 369-370

Literature 
C.S. Lewis, Hamlet: The Prince or the Poem?, Proceedings of the British Academy 18 (1942)

German non-fiction writers
Shakespearean scholars
1820 births
1894 deaths
Heads of the Ernestine Gymnasium, Gotha
Writers from Hamburg
People from Gotha (town)
Translators of William Shakespeare
German male dramatists and playwrights
19th-century German dramatists and playwrights
19th-century German male writers
German male poets
Male non-fiction writers